Coastal Andhra or Kosta Andhra (IAST: Kōstā Āndhra) is a geographic region in the Indian state of Andhra Pradesh. Vijayawada is the largest city in this region. It was part of Madras State before 1953 and Andhra State from 1953 to 1956. This area includes the coastal districts of Andhra Pradesh on the Circar Coast  between the Eastern Ghats and the Bay of Bengal, from the northern border with Uttarandhra in the South.

Coastal Andhra is a fertile region suitable for agriculture, which is facilitated by the rivers Godavari, Krishna and Penna. The prosperity of Coastal Andhra can be attributed to its rich agricultural land and an abundant water supply from these three rivers. Rice grown in paddy fields is the main crop, with pulses and coconuts also being important. The fishing industry is also important to the region.

History 
The region of Andhra rose to political power during the reign of the Maurya Dynasty. Megasthenes mentioned that Andhra was a flourishing empire of the Satavahanas' since before the common era. Coastal Andhra was also ruled by the famous Chalukyas in between the period of the 7th Century and the 10th century CE. This period was followed by the reign of many other dynasties such as the Cholas, the Kakatiyas as well as the Vijayanagar Empire.

According to 11th century inscriptions, coastal Andhra is bounded by Mahendragiri mountains (in north-eastern border with Gajapati district of Orissa), Kalahasti temple (in Chittoor district near the border of Nellore district), Srisailam temple (in Kurnool district near the border of Mahbubnagar district and Prakasham district).

The Gajapati and Ganjam districts of Odisha were granted to the French East India Company around 1752. Later they were transferred by the French to the British. Nellore, which extends as far as Ongole Taluk, was later received from the Nawab of Arcot, under an establishment. Some parts of present-day Nellore and Chittoor were in the hands of Venkatagiri Rajas. The British made an arrangement with the Raja of Venkatagiri in 1802 to claim power in those territories also.

The districts of Andhra (Circar) and Rayalaseema were ceded by the Nizam of Hyderabad to the British colonial administration, which became part of Madras Presidency.

Geography 
Coastal Andhra is located in the eastern region of the state of Andhra Pradesh on the Circar Coast and comprises twelve districts: East Godavari, West Godavari, Guntur, Palnadu, Krishna, Nellore, Kakinada, Prakasam, NTR, Bapatla, Konaseema and Eluru. It borders Rayalaseema, Uttarandhra regions of the state and the states of Telangana. The presence of the Godavari River, Krishna River and Penna River makes the area fertile for irrigation. The coastal line of this region is the second longest in the country, extending up to 974 km.

Demographics 

The area had a total population of 34,195,655 as per 2011 Census of India.

Coastal Andhra is predominantly Hindu (around 93%). Estimates of the Christian population are around 1.51% of the Coastal Andhra population.

The main and most spoken language is Telugu.

Culture 
Kuchipudi is the classical dance form of the state, which was originated in the Kuchipudi village of Krishna district.

Cuisine 
Rice is the staple food in the coastal cuisine and is usually consumed with a variety of curries and lentil soups or broths. The cuisine of Coastal Andhra is influenced by various seafood varieties.

Politics 
The Twelve districts of Coastal Andhra region are: East Godavari, West Godavari, Guntur, Krishna, Nellore, Prakasam, Palnadu, Bapatla, Kakinada, Eluru, NTR, and Konaseema.

Chief Ministers from the region are:
 Tanguturi Prakasam Panthulu – 1st Chief Minister of Andhra State (Prakasam).
 Bezawada Gopala Reddy – 2nd Chief Minister of Andhra State (Nellore).
 Kasu Brahmananda Reddy – 3rd Chief Minister of Andhra Pradesh (Guntur).
 Bhavanam Venkatarami Reddy – 8th Chief Minister of Andhra Pradesh (Guntur).
 N. T. Rama Rao – 10th Chief Minister of Andhra Pradesh (Krishna).
 Nadendla Bhaskara Rao – 11th Chief Minister of Andhra Pradesh (Guntur).
 K. Rosaiah – 15th Chief Minister of Andhra Pradesh (Guntur).

Cities and towns 
 Vijayawada, Guntur, Nellore, Eluru, Rajamahendravaram, Kakinada, are popular cities in this region. The other major cities of this region are Gudivada, Tenali, Narasaraopeta, Bhimavaram, Machilipatnam, Ongole. Also other major towns in the region are Tenali, Chirala, Tadepalligudem, Amalapuram, Palakollu, Narasapuram, Kavali, Chilakaluripet, Kandukur.

Tourism

Buddhist hub 

Coastal Andhra is one of the major Buddhist hubs in India after the Gangetic plains in Bihar, Jharkhand and Uttar Pradesh. Many remnants from large monasteries to small stupas are found in this region from Srikakulam district in the North to Nellore district in the South. Archaeological excavations conducted at Gudivada yielded an ancient Buddhist stupa mound. The major Buddhist Remnant sites in this region are as Amaravathi, Salihundam, Ramatheertham, Thotlakonda, Bavikonda, Bojjannakonda, Kummarilova, Kodavali, Bhattiprolu etc.

Rivers, lakes and wetlands 
Andhra Pradesh contains 259 coastal wetlands, covering an area of 18,552 km2, out of which 88 are manmade.

Lake Kolleru a major lake in Coastal Andhra. Kolleru, a natural sweet-water lake, is situated in the West Godavari district and serves as a natural flood-balancing reservoir for the two rivers. The lake is also an important habitat for up to 50,000 resident and migratory birds. The lake was declared a wildlife sanctuary in November 1999 under India's Wildlife Protection Act, and designated a wetland of international importance in November 2002 under the international Ramsar Convention. In this region, the river Akhanda Godavari splits into several distributary branches, including the Gouthami, Vasishta, Vainatheya, and Vruddha Gouthami, before emptying into the Bay of Bengal.

Transport 

 The South Coast Railway Zone(SCoR) with its headquarters at Visakhapatnam Railway Station serves majority of the Andhra Pradesh. Vijayawada & Visakhapatnam railway station are one of the busiest railway junctions in India, serving many trains.
 Buses and trains originate from stations in this region, including Visakhapatnam, Rajamahendravaram, Kakinada Port, Kakinada Town railway station, Narsapuram, Machilipatnam, Vijayawada, Guntur, Tenali, Nellore railway station, and Repalle. PNBS, Vijayawada is one of the largest bus terminals in the country.
 The airports which are currently operating in this region are Visakhapatnam International Airport, Vijayawada International Airport, Rajahmundry Airport. The airports which are under construction in this region are Bhogapuram International Airport and Nellore Airport.
 Visakhapatnam Port and Kakinada Port are the major ports in Coastal Andhra. The state of Andhra Pradesh is the second-busiest maritime state (after Gujarat) in terms of cargo handled. Visakhapatnam Port is the one of the busiest cargo-handling ports in the country.
 Krishnapatnam Port at Nellore and Gangavaram Port are major private ports, and there are minor ports at Machilipatnam Port and Nizampatnam Port in Guntur.

Notable personalities 

National flag design
 Pingali Venkayya

Singers
 Bala Murali Krishna
 SP Balasubramanyam
 S Janaki
 P Susheela

Telugu literature, arts and cinema
 Nannayya
 Tikkana
 Tenali Ramakrishna
 Gurajada Apparao
 Kandukuri Veeresalingam
 Devulapalli Venkata Krishna Sastri
 Tripuraneni Ramaswamy Chowdary
 Gurram Jashuva
 S. V. Ranga Rao
 Ghantasala
 Pingali Venkayya
 N. T. Rama Rao
 Akkineni Nageswara Rao
 Krishna Ghattamaneni
 Chiranjeevi
 Nandamuri Balakrishna
 Pavan kalyan
 Goparaju Ramachandra Rao
 S. S. Rajamouli

See also 
 Northern Circars
 Rayalaseema
 Uttarandhra

References

External links 

 
Coromandel Coast
Regions of Andhra Pradesh
Proposed states and union territories of India